HMS Linaria was a  of the Royal Navy, which saw service during the Second World War. Originally built for the US Navy as Clash (PG-91), formerly CN-309, she was launched on 18 November 1942, by Midland Shipyards, Ltd., Midland, Ontario, Canada. Upon completion Clash was transferred to the Royal Navy on 19 June 1943, and commissioned as HMS Linaria. On 27 July 1946, she was returned to the US Navy. Never commissioned in the US Navy, Clash was sold on 15 January 1948 for commercial use and reportedly renamed Porto Offuro.

References

External links
DANFS - Clash
DANFS - Linaria
NavSource Online: Gunboat Photo Archive -  Linaria (PG 91) ex-HMS Linaria (K 282) ex-Clash (PG 91) ex-CN-309

World War II naval ships of the United States
Action-class gunboats
Ships built in Ontario
Flower-class corvettes of the Royal Navy
1942 ships